Justin R. Rattner is a retired Intel Senior Fellow, Corporate Vice President and former director of Intel Labs. Previously, he served as the corporation's Chief Technology Officer, where he was responsible for leading Intel's microprocessor, communications and systems technology labs and Intel Research.

In 1989, Rattner was named Scientist of the Year by R&D Magazine for his leadership in parallel and distributed computer architecture. In December 1996, Rattner was featured as Person of the Week by ABC World News for his visionary work on the Department of Energy ASCI Red System, the first computer to sustain one trillion operations per second (one teraFLOPS) and the fastest computer in the world between 1996 and 2000. In 1997, Rattner was honored as one of the Computing 200, the 200 individuals having the greatest impact on the U.S. computer industry today, and subsequently profiled in the book Wizards and Their Wonders from ACM Press.

Rattner has received two Intel Achievement Awards for his work in high performance computing and advanced cluster communication architecture. He was a longstanding member of Intel's Research Council and Academic Advisory Council. He previously served as the Intel executive sponsor for Cornell University on the External Advisory Board for the College of Engineering. Rattner joined Intel in 1973. He was named its first principal engineer in 1979, its fourth Intel Fellow in 1988, and one of the first four senior fellows in 2002.

Prior to joining Intel, Rattner held positions with Hewlett-Packard Company and Xerox Corporation. He received bachelor's and master's degrees from Cornell University in Electrical Engineering and Computer Science in 1970 and 1972, respectively. In 2012, Rattner was bestowed an honorary Doctor of Science from Willamette University in Salem, Oregon, where he delivered the commencement address to the Atkinson Graduate School of Management (AGSM).

Rattner lives near Portland, Oregon where he and his three children own and operate a large equestrian competition and training facility.

Honors/Achievements 
 Awarded Honorary Doctor of Science by Willamette University, May 2012 
 ABC World News Person of the Week, December 1996 
 World's Fastest Computers 1996-2000  
 R&D Magazine Scientist of the Year 1989
 Received two Intel Achievement Awards
 Globe Award by the Oregon Center for Advanced Technology Education 1989

Patents 
 , 7 February 1989
 , 30 August 1983 
 , 7 June 1983 
 , 13 April 1982

References

External links 
 Justin Rattner's Blog on ZDNet
 Biography as given by Intel.com

Most of this information was taken from the Intel website (see external links)

Living people
Intel people
Xerox people
Hewlett-Packard people
American computer businesspeople
American chief technology officers
Computer designers
Computer hardware engineers
Cornell University College of Engineering alumni
Businesspeople from Portland, Oregon
Year of birth missing (living people)